The 2001 Radio Disney Music Awards were held on December 23, 2001, at the Radio Disney studios. It was the first edition of the award.

Production
At that time the Radio Disney Music Awards was not an official ceremony but just a special edition on the Radio Disney broadcast. It was held on December 23, 2001. The Radio Disney Music Awards contained 9 categories, with 3 nominees for votes in 4 weeks.

Nominees and winners
List of categories and winners in 2001.

Best Female Artist
Mandy Moore
Britney Spears
Jessica Simpson

Best Male Artist
Aaron Carter
Bow Wow
Lil' Romeo

Best Music Group
Backstreet Boys
NSYNC
Play

Best Song
"I Wanna Be with You" – Mandy Moore
"Aaron's Party (Come Get It)" – Aaron Carter
"Shape of My Heart" – Backstreet Boys

Best Album
"Black & Blue" – Backstreet Boys
"Aaron's Party (Come Get It)" – Aaron Carter
"I Wanna Be with You" – Mandy Moore

Best Homework Song
"I Can't Wait" – Hilary Duff
"I Wanna Be with You" – Mandy Moore
"My Baby" – Lil' Romeo

Best Soundtrack Song
"I Can't Wait" – Hilary Duff
"It's Raining Men" – Geri Halliwell
"Little Bitty Pretty One" – Aaron Carter

Best Style
Amanda Bynes
Kirsten Storms
Melissa Joan Hart

Most Talked About Artist
Amanda Bynes
Andrew Lawrence
Hilary Duff

References

External links
Official website

Radio Disney Music Awards
Radio Disney Music Awards
Radio Disney Music Awards
Radio Disney Music Awards
2001 awards in the United States